William Snell (23 March 1927 – 18 March 2009) was an Australian rules footballer who played with Essendon in the VFL during the early 1950s.

A centre half forward, Snell made his debut in Dick Reynolds's 300th game. He was a member of Essendon's 1950 premiership team and also played in the side which lost the decider the following season. He suffered a serious head injury during a pre-season game before the 1951 season.  Although doctors feared that he would never play football again, Snell returned to play the last eight games of the 1951 VFL season, including Essendon's loss to Geelong in the 1951 VFL Grand Final.  He played a further eight games in 1952 before retiring from the VFL and going to coach the Stawell Football Club in 1953.

References

External links

1927 births
Australian rules footballers from Victoria (Australia)
Essendon Football Club players
Essendon Football Club Premiership players
2009 deaths
One-time VFL/AFL Premiership players